Ángel Corella López (born 8 November 1975) is a Spanish former principal dancer with the American Ballet Theatre (the only Spaniard to have achieved such a position in history) and guest artist with The Royal Ballet, Kirov Ballet, New York City Ballet, La Scala and the Australian Ballet among many others.

Considered one of the leading dancers of his generation, he has received numerous awards including the Prix Benois de la Danse and the national award of Spain. He is also credited with ushering in a new era for male ballet in America, thanks to his appearance in the 2002 documentary Born to be Wild and successful franchise show Kings of the Dance. The New York Times said Corella gave "classical dancing, especially in the 19th-century repertory, a new image."

Having appeared on the front cover of The New York Times on various occasions, he is described as a "a dancer capable of turning performance into sensation" and as a "force of nature" by the Los Angeles Times.

After performing at the Kennedy Center Honors for the third time in 2014 he was made an official member of the artistic committee. He is the most featured dancer of the American Ballet Theatre in DVD recordings and his appearance as Prince Siegfried in the PBS presentation of Swan Lake won an Emmy Award.

Corella is the only dancer with a statue in the Madrid Wax Museum, and has both a secondary school and dance museum named after him. He has also been a judge on the Spanish version of the popular television show Mira Quien Baila.

On 22 July 2014, the Pennsylvania Ballet announced that Corella has been appointed as its artistic director.

Early career
Born and raised in Madrid, Corella trained with Karemia Moreno and Víctor Ullate and began winning dance awards at a young age, including the First Prize in the National Ballet Competition of Spain in 1991 and three years later, the Grand Prix and Gold Medal at the Concours International de Danse de Paris.

When the world-renowned Russian ballerina Natalia Makarova saw the young Corella in competition, she contacted the artistic director of American Ballet Theatre and recommended that he be auditioned for the company. She described him later to the publication Dance Magazine as "exceptionally incredible… he is an angel who has been sent to us." He was accepted into ABT as a soloist in April 1995 and was promoted the following year (August 1996) to the rank of principal dancer.

Professional work
Ángel Corella has performed as a guest artist with such companies as The Royal Ballet in London, the La Scala Ballet in Milan, the New York City Ballet, the Australian Ballet, the Ballet of Tokyo, the Asami Maki Ballet, Ballet Contemporaneo de Caracas, the National Ballet of Chile and the Kirov Ballet at the Mariinsky Theatre in St. Petersburg, Russia.

In recent years Corella has danced for an array of world leaders including Queen Elizabeth II of the United Kingdom, Queen Sofía of Spain, Princess Letizia of Spain, the Duchess of Alba and United States Presidents Barack Obama, Bill Clinton and George W. Bush. He has on several occasions been a guest at the White House.

In 2006, Corella established the touring show Kings of the Dance alongside fellow leading men Gudrun Bojesen of The Royal Danish Ballet; Johan Kobborg of the Royal Ballet; Ethan Stiefel of ABT; and Nikolay Tsiskaridze of the Bolshoi Ballet. which premiered, at the Orange County Performing Arts Center in Costa Mesa, CA, immediately followed by an East Coast premiere at City Center. In 2007, Kings of the Dance  toured to Russia with performances in St. Petersburg, Moscow, ad Perm, Russia.  The next year, Angel Corella was the sole returning original cast member to perform it at the Mariinsky Festival. Since its inception, the franchise has been continued by various other dancers.

Corella also devised an annual touring group entitled Angel Corella and stars of American Ballet which performed throughout Spain for seven years.

Corella has also collaborated for gala performances with a variety of artists including actress Bette Midler, violinist Ara Malikian as well as opera singers Cecilia Bartoli and Ainhoa Arteta.

After having danced in the operatic production La Gioconda at New York's Metropolitan Opera House, Barcelona's Liceu opera house, Madrid's Teatro Real and the Teatro dell'Opera in Rome, Corella made his debut with the Paris Opera in 2013.

He has had the opportunity to partner many well-known ballerinas including Alessandra Ferri, Xiomara Reyes, Julie Kent, Gillian Murphy, Diana Vishneva, Alina Cojocaru, Nina Ananiashvili, Paloma Herrera, Irina Dvorovenko, Viktoria Tereshkina, Alina Somova, Evgenia Obraztsova, Alexandra Ansanelli, Michele Wiles, Stella Abrera, Letizia Giuliani, Leanne Benjamin and Lucia Lacarra, among others.

Encouraging of young professionals, he is a regular judge at several prestigious dance competitions such as the International Ballet and Choreography competition (Beijing) and has also taught at the various summer programs and leading dance schools including the Royal Ballet School in London.

The New York Times
Throughout his career Angel Corella has won the respect of both the notorious New York critics and international publications due to both his technical capabilities and artistic prowess.

In Corella's debut year with American Ballet Theatre, during a performance of Twyla Tharp's Americans We, The New York Times praised Corella's performance saying the ballet "explodes with this young dancer’s phenomenal bravura. Don’t miss him." Increasing interest from audience and critics alike led quickly to more demanding principal roles. In his debut as the lead in the epic ballet La Bayadere the critic read "Angel Corella was nothing short of perfect."

Described as a virtuoso for his trademark feats of endurance "extremely fast pirouettes suddenly speeding up rather than slowing down" Corella excelled in the most demanding roles of the classical repertoire. Upon reviewing his first performance in Le Corsaire, The New York Times said "This performance bought the house down!" The newspaper also praised his versatility "Mr Corella is the rare dancer who has performed magnificently in each part he has been given."

Remarking on his artistic flair, the New York Times described Corella as a "highly sophisticated artist" referencing his "finely nuanced acting" and stated that "the young Spaniard could wow audiences with multiple pirouettes, but it was his joy of dance that carried the day."

It was cited that Corella was often "the star - and the heart of the show" frequently causing the audience to erupt into "feverish applause" and that "by sheer force, he put the company one step ahead,"

In the year of his retirement from the American Ballet Theatre, The New York Times wrote "Dancers like Angel Corella are hard to come by, and that speaks to more than just the radiance of his technique. He’s generous with his talent too."

Roles
  
Prince Siegfried in Swan Lake
Des Grieux in Manon
Romeo in Romeo and Juliet
Albrecht in Giselle
Peasant Pas de deux from Giselle
Colas In La Fille Mal Gardée
Conrad in Le Corsaire
Ali the Slave in Le Corsaire
Birbanto in Le Corsaire
Lensky in Onegin
The Prince in Cinderella
Solor in La Bayadère
The Bronze Idol in La Bayadere
Basilio in Don Quixote
Gypsy King in Don Quixote
Danilo in The Merry Widow
Camille in The Merry Widow
James in La Sylphide
Franz in Coppélia
Cassio in Othello
The Bluebird Pas de deux from The Sleeping Beauty
 
Prince Désiré in The Sleeping Beauty
The Nutcracker Prince in The Nutcracker
The Cavalier in The Nutcracker
Henry VIII in VIII
Petruchio in The Taming of the Shrew
The Blue Boy in Les Patineurs
The Rose in Le Spectre de la Rose
The Son in The Prodigal Son
The Peruvian in Gaîté Parisienne
Billy in Billy the Kid
Aktaion in Artemis
Petrouchka in Petrouchka
Her Lover in Jardin aux Lilas
The First Sailor in Fancy Free
The Third Sailor in Fancy Free
Aktaion in Artemis
The Man from the House Opposite in Pillar of Fire
Misgir in The Snow Maiden
Her Lover in Weren't We Fools?
The Dancemaster in The Lesson
Oberon in The Dream

Leading roles in other ballets include the following: Symphony in C, Other Dances, Push Comes to Shove, The Sleeping Beauty Act II, Within You Without You: A Tribute to George Harrison, Variations on America, Tchaikovsky Pas de Deux, Theme and Variations, The Brahms-Haydn Variations, Bruch Violin Concerto, Drink To Me Only With Thine Eyes, Ballet Imperial, Sinfonietta, Gong, Who Cares?, Variations For Four, The Leaves Are Fading, Mozartiana, Without Words, A Brahms Symphony, Stepping Stones, Americans We, and Spring and Fall, Concerto no. 1 for Piano & Orchestra, Sinatra Suite, In the Upper Room, and Allegro Brillante, among others.
Ballets created on Corella by today's choreographers: For 4 by Christopher Wheeldon, Non Troppo by Mark Morris, The Pied Piper by David Parsons, HereAfter by Natalie Weir & Stanton Welch, Meadow by Lar Lubovitch, Baroque Game by Robert Hill, Concerto No. 1 for Piano and Orchestra by Robert Hill, Known by Heart by Twyla Tharp,  Getting Closer by John Neumeier, Sin and Tonic by James Kudelka, and both Clear and We Got it Good by choreographer Stanton Welch.
Ballets in Opera Productions:  Dance of the Hours in Ponchielli's La Gioconda choreographed by George Iancu in Barcelona 2005 as well as Christopher Wheeldon's new Dance of the Hours in Ponchielli's La Gioconda for the Metropolitan Opera in New York City, 2006. (Debut performances).

Popular culture 
Corella's global success has on occasion allowed for him to appear in mainstream popular culture.

In 1998 a young Corella appeared on the long-running children's television show Sesame Street. After chatting with the likes of Elmo, Corella danced a rendition of the alphabet.

In 2006 Corella appeared alongside Gwyneth Paltrow in the big-budget Christmas commercial for the luxury cava Freixenet. He was also the sole performer in the 2008 multi media campaign for Rolex, for which he was the Spanish ambassador for several years.

Corella has represented high fashion designers such as Loewe, as well as popular dance brands such as Bloch and Sansha. He has also featured in the magazines Vogue, Vanity Fair, W, GQ and Men's Health which recognised him as one of 2007's Men of the Year.

In 2014 Corella was a judge on the Spanish version of the American hit TV show Dancing with the Stars. Which ran for a total of fourteen weeks and averaged a weekly audience of three million viewers.

Corella has also appeared on a variety of talk shows in the United States including Charlie Rose and Jay Leno, as well as many Spanish entertainment programs like Buena Fuente, Sorpresa Sorpresa and Quien Vive Aqui.

Retirement from American Ballet Theatre 
Upon his retirement from ABT in 2012, Corella performed to a sell out audience at the Metropolitan Opera House and received a standing ovation lasting over twenty minutes. The New Yorker commemorated the occasion by caricaturing the artist. The arts journal wrote "For a long and happy time, we thought of Angel Corella, a much adored star of American Ballet theatre, simply as a king of dance. Now we are coming to know him as a native son."

Television appearances
1996 Kennedy Center Honors
1998 Sesame Street
1999 "Reopening of the Royal Opera House, London"
2001 Charlie Rose
2000 PBS presentation of documentary film Born To Be Wild - The Leading Men of American Ballet Theatre
2005 (Emmy Award-winning) PBS presentation of Tchaikovsky's Swan Lake, with Gillian Murphy and Marcelo Gomes (Staging by Kevin McKenzie)
2006 Freixenet commercial
2008 Rolex commercial
2011 "Quien Vive Aqui"
2012 "Buena Fuente"
2014 "Mira Quien Baila"

Corella's DVD recordings

Swan Lake with Gillian Murphy (American Ballet Theatre - 2005)
Romeo and Juliet with Alessandra Ferri (La Scala Ballet - 2000)
Le Corsaire with Julie Kent/Ethan Stiefel (American Ballet Theatre - 1998 VHS, 2001 DVD)
Born To Be Wild - The Leading Men of American Ballet Theatre (biographical documentary - 1999) with Vladimir Malakhov, Jose Manuel Carreño, and Ethan Stiefel.
Don Quixote Pas de Deux with Paloma Herrera (American Ballet Theatre) on a mixed bill DVD titled American Ballet Theatre Now - Variety and Virtuosity  (1996)
 "Reopening of the Royal Opera House", London (1999)
 "La Gioconda" Liceu Opera House (2005)

Awards
National Ballet Competition of Spain - First prize, May 1991
Concours International de Danse de Paris - Grand Prix / Gold Medal, December 1994
Prix Benois de la Danse, 2000
National Award of Spain, 2003
Premio Protagonista, Luis del Olmo, 2005
Men's Health award, 2007
Dance Europe Magazine DANCER OF THE YEAR Award, 2007
Leonid Massine Award, 2008
International medal from the community of madrid, 2008
International Medal of Arts, Madrid, Spain, 2009
Gold Medal the academy of fine arts, Cadiz
Galileo 2000 Award, Florence, 2009
Sports and Culture award, Barcelona, 2011

Barcelona Ballet

In April 2008, Corella established the first classical ballet company in Spain in 20 years, the Corella Ballet, Castilla y Leon; in February 2012, it moved to Barcelona and became the Barcelona Ballet.

The company had its world premiere in La Granja, Segovia, Spain on 11 July 2008 performing a mixed program of Clark Tippet's Bruch Violin Concerto, Stanton Welch's Clear and Twyla Tharp's In the Upper Room. Its first full-length ballet was La Bayadère (staging by Natalia Makarova) on 4 September 2008 at the Teatro Real in Madrid, Spain.

Barcelona Ballet has since gone on to expand its repertoire and gain a great following across both Spain and the rest of the world.  They are a touring company performing in many theatres across Spain, including Teatro Real, Madrid and the Liceu, Barcelona. They have performed internationally at the New York City Center in March 2010 as well as at the Los Angeles Music Center and Santa Barbara, California. They have toured cities such as New Orleans, Seattle, Charleston, the Spoleto Festival and the Guadalajara book festival, Mexico in November 2010.

Their repertoire includes Swan Lake, suites from Le Corsaire and The Sleeping Beauty, George Balanchine's Tschaikovsky Pas de Deux and Apollo pas de deux, Christopher Wheeldon's After the Rain pas de deux, María Pagés' SOLEÁ pas de deux, and the pas de deuxs from Diana and Actaeon, Don Quixote and Satanella; Balanchine's Who Cares?, Jerome Robbins's Fancy Free, Wheeldon's DGV: Danse à Grande Vitesse and VIII, Welch's We got it good, Russell Ducker's Epimitheus, Vasiliov and Kasatkina's Sunny Duet, Leonid Lavrovsky's Walpurgisnacht, Corella, Ducker & Radev's Suspended in Time, Corella's String Sextet, Paquita Joseph Mazilier, Facing the light Radev, and the Suite of Sleeping beauty after Petipa.

Barcelona Ballet returned to New York City Center in April 2012 with a world premiere of "Palpito" by Spanish choreographers Rojas y Rodriguez as well as visiting Purchase, NY, Detroit, Houston.

In early 2013 Corella made the decision to dissolve the company to pursue other projects, indicating that he would likely head to the United States for professional reasons.

Corella continues to perform internationally, collaborating with various artists and choreographers, and was appointed as the Artistic Director of the Pennsylvania Ballet in July, 2014.

References

Bio Page at ABT's Website
Article from Dance Magazine (Cover Story, 1995)
Article from Ballet Alert Online (1999)
Interview from Ballet Magazine (2001)
Interview from Travel Classics Magazine (2006)

External links
 Angel Corella
 Barcelona Ballet
Link to Forum Angel Corella

Reviews
NY Times review of La Bayadere (May 1999)
Review of The Pied Piper (May 2001)
NY Times review of The Pied Piper (May 2001)
Online review of Don Quixote (July 2004)
NY Times Review of Don Quixote (May 2005)
Online review of Raymonda (July 2005)
Online review of Kings of the Dance (Feb. 2006)
Online review of Corella in the Met's opera La Gioconda -Dance of the Hours (Sep. 2006)
Review of Corella in La Bayadere from Ballet Magazine (June 2007)

Spanish male ballet dancers
1975 births
Living people
Prix Benois de la Danse winners
American Ballet Theatre principal dancers
21st-century ballet dancers